A genetic predisposition is a genetic characteristic which influences the possible phenotypic development of an individual organism within a species or population under the influence of environmental conditions. In medicine, genetic susceptibility to a disease refers to a genetic predisposition to a health problem, which may eventually be triggered by particular environmental or lifestyle factors, such as tobacco smoking or diet.  Genetic testing is able to identify individuals who are genetically predisposed to certain diseases.

Behavior

Predisposition is the capacity humans are born with to learn things such as language and concept of self. Negative environmental influences may block the predisposition (ability) one has to do some things.  Behaviors displayed by animals can be influenced by genetic predispositions. Genetic predisposition towards certain human behaviors is scientifically investigated by attempts to identify patterns of human behavior that seem to be invariant over long periods of time and in very different cultures.

For example, philosopher Daniel Dennett has proposed that humans are genetically predisposed to have a theory of mind because there has been evolutionary selection for the human ability to adopt the intentional stance. The intentional stance is a useful behavioral strategy by which humans assume that others have minds like their own. This assumption allows one to predict the behavior of others based on personal knowledge.

In 1951, Hans Eysenck and Donald Prell published an experiment in which identical (monozygotic) and fraternal (dizygotic) twins, ages 11 and 12, were tested for neuroticism.  It is described in detail in an article published in the Journal of Mental Science. in which Eysenck and Prell concluded that, "The factor of neuroticism is not a statistical artifact, but constitutes a biological unit which is inherited as a whole....neurotic Genetic predisposition is to a large extent hereditarily determined."

E. O. Wilson's book on sociobiology and his book Consilience discuss the idea of genetic predisposition of behaviors.

The field of evolutionary psychology explores the idea that certain behaviors have been selected for during the course of evolution.

Genetic discrimination in health insurance in US

In US, the Genetic Information Nondiscrimination Act, which was signed into law by President Bush on May 21, 2008, prohibits discrimination in employment and health insurance based on genetic information.

See also

Human nature
Nature versus nurture
Behavioral genetics
Predispositioning Theory
Psychiatric genetics
Gene-environment correlation
Eugenics
Eggshell skull
MODY
Allergy
Oncogene
Quantitative trait locus
Genetic privacy

References

  The results of this survey are discussed here (January 20, 1998).
  A summary of U.S.A. executive orders and proposed legislation is compiled by the National Center for Genome Resources.
  The Intentional Stance (MIT Press; Reprint edition 1989)

External links
Genetic discrimination fact sheet from the National Human Genome Research Institute.

Genetics
Behavioural sciences